The 1938 Mercer Bears football team was an American football team that represented Mercer University as a member of the Dixie Conference during the 1938 college football season. In their tenth year under head coach Lake Russell, the team compiled a 3–6 record.

Schedule

References

Mercer
Mercer Bears football seasons
Mercer Bears football